Deveron is a given name. Notable people with the name include:

Deveron Carr (born 1990), American football player
Deveron Harper (born 1977), American football player